Ciceronianus ("The Ciceronian") is a treatise written by Desiderius Erasmus and published in 1528. It attacks the style of scholarly Latin written during the early 16th century, which style attempted to ape Cicero's Latin.

Content
As Cicero lived before Jesus, Erasmus saw Cicero's Latin as pagan, and therefore unsuited to translating holy texts. Because Cicero had no words for Christian theological concepts, he suggested that modern Ciceronian purists would have to use pagan language, for example calling the Christian God "Jupiter Maximus" and Jesus himself "Apollo". Erasmus argues that if Cicero himself had become a Christian he would have adapted his language to incorporate Biblical names and concepts. Erasmus also sought to defend medieval Latinists whose allegedly barbarous style the Ciceronians had ridiculed. He argued that excessively strict adherence to Cicero led to a form of literary idolatry. It also turned Latin into a "dead" language rather than a living and evolving means of international intellectual communication.

The treatise takes the form of a dialogue between the Ciceronian "Nosoponus" and his opponent "Bulephorus" (representing Erasmus). Bulephorus's views are supported by "Hypologus". Erasmus's persona approaches his argument in an intentionally entertaining and satirical style, imagining the Ciceronian purists having to write their ultra-sterilised prose in soundproof rooms to avoid any violation by real life, especially the distressingly vulgar speech of children and women.

Replies
In 1531 Julius Caesar Scaliger printed his first oration against Erasmus, in defence of Cicero and the Ciceronians, dismissing Erasmus as a literary parasite, a mere corrector of texts. In 1535, Étienne Dolet also published a riposte, Erasmianus, defending Ciceronian Latin. The Italian scholar Giulio Camillo's response, Trattato dell’ Imitatione, written in Paris, was published in the year of Camillo's death, 1544.

References

External links
English translation at Internet Archive
Facsimile of a Latin edition

1528 books
16th-century Christian texts
Books about paganism
Books about writing
Books by Desiderius Erasmus
Cicero
16th-century Latin books